Jalan Besar (literally "Large Road" in Malay, but taken to mean "Main Road") is a one-way road in Singapore, connecting Lavender Street in Kallang and Rochor Canal Road in Rochor.

See also
Jalan Besar Stadium

References
Victor R Savage, Brenda S A Yeoh (2003), Toponymics - A Study of Singapore Street Names, Eastern Universities Press, 
 Jalan Besar: A Heritage Trail (2006), National Heritage Board.

Places in Singapore
Roads in Singapore
Kallang
Rochor